Raúl Orosco Delgadillo (born 25 March 1979 in Cochabamba) is a Bolivian football referee.
He became an International FIFA referee in 2009 and has since been appointed in the Copa Libertadores, Copa Sudamericana, U-15 South American Championships and in the 2014 FIFA World Cup qualification which were held in his native country.

His first senior national teams' competition was the 2011 Copa América in Argentina.

References

1979 births
Living people
Bolivian football referees
Copa América referees
Olympic football referees
Football referees at the 2012 Summer Olympics